General elections were held in Siam on 29 January 1948. Following the 1947 coup, the unicameral parliament elected in 1946 was abrogated. It was replaced by a bicameral parliament, with a 100-seat appointed Senate and a 99-member House of Representatives.

At the time there were no political parties, so all candidates ran as independents. Voter turnout was 29.5%.

Results

Aftermath
In order to comply with the constitutional requirement of one member of the House of Representatives for every 150,000 citizens, supplementary elections were held in June 1949.

References

Siam
General
Elections in Thailand
Election and referendum articles with incomplete results
Non-partisan elections